Begum Khurshida Jahan Haq (11 August 1939 – 14 June 2006) (nicknamed 'Chocolate Apa') was the Minister of Women's and Children's Affairs of Bangladesh from 2001 to 2006, serving under her sister, Prime Minister Khaleda Zia.  During her term in office, she worked to curb human trafficking of women and children in Bangladesh, as well as to provide programs and services to rehabilitate former victims of human trafficking.

Early life and education
Khurshid Jahan Haq was born on 11 August 1939 in Balaburi, in the Dinajpur District of the Bengal Presidency. She belonged to a Bengali Muslim family with origins in Fulgazi, Feni District. She was the daughter of tea-businessman Iskandar Ali Majumder, who was in turn the son of Salamat Ali Majumdar, who was the son of Azgar Ali Majumdar, who was the son of Nahar Muhammad Khan, who was the son of Murad Khan, a 16th-century Middle Eastern immigrant. Her mother, Taiyaba Majumder, was from Chandbari (now in Uttar Dinajpur District).

After matriculation from the local schools, she attended Kumudini College where she received a BA degree in 1958.  During her college years, she was active in student government and served as Secretary of the Students' Union in 1956–57.

Career
Jahan served as a vice-chairmen of Bangladesh Nationalist Party, and in 1991 was named as a Member of Parliament (MP) in the reserved seat for women.  She was later twice re-elected as MP from the Dinajpur-3 constituency, in 1996 and 2001.  She was given the position of Minister of Women's and Children's Affairs on 10 October 2001, and held the position until her death in 2006.

References

1939 births
2006 deaths
Women members of the Jatiya Sangsad
Bangladesh Nationalist Party politicians
20th-century Bangladeshi women politicians
21st-century women politicians
5th Jatiya Sangsad members
7th Jatiya Sangsad members
8th Jatiya Sangsad members
Women and Children Affairs ministers of Bangladesh
People from Dinajpur District, Bangladesh
People from Fulgazi Upazila
Bangladeshi people of Middle Eastern descent
21st-century Bangladeshi women politicians
Majumder–Zia family